In chemistry an eclipsed conformation is a conformation in which two substituents X and Y on adjacent atoms A, B are in closest proximity, implying that the torsion angle X–A–B–Y is 0°. Such a conformation can exist in any open chain, single chemical bond connecting two sp3-hybridised atoms, and it is normally a conformational energy maximum.  This maximum is often explained by steric hindrance, but its origins sometimes actually lie in hyperconjugation (as when the eclipsing interaction is of two hydrogen atoms).

In order to gain a deeper understanding of eclipsed conformations in organic chemistry, it is first important to understand how organic molecules are arranged around bonds, as well as how they move and rotate.

In the example of ethane, two methyl groups are connected with a carbon-carbon sigma bond, just as one might connect two Lego pieces through a single “stud” and “tube”.  With this image in mind, if the methyl groups are rotated around the bond, they will remain connected; however, the shape will change. There are multiple possible results of this, such as different 3-dimensional shapes, also known as, “conformations“, or, “conformational isomers“, or sometimes, “rotational isomers (rotamers)”.

Organic Chemistry
When studying newman projections, dihedral angles are used to determine the placements of atoms and their distance from one another. This can indicate staggered and eclipsed orientation, but is specifically used to determine the angle between 2 specific atoms on opposing carbons. Torsional strain is a term used to refer to the barrier of rotation in the molecule being studied. This is how conformations are assigned energy levels.

In the example of ethane in Newman projection it shows that rotation around the carbon-carbon bond is not entirely free but that an energy barrier exists. The ethane molecule in the eclipsed conformation is said to suffer from torsional strain and by a rotation around the carbon carbon bond to the staggered conformation around 12.5 kJ/mol of torsional energy is released.

In regards to butane and its 4 carbon chain, three carbon-carbon bonds are available to rotate. The example below is looking down the C2 and C3 bond. Below is the sawhorse and Newman representation of butane in an eclipsed conformation with the two CH3 groups (C1 and C4) at a 0 degree angle from one another (left).

If the front is rotated 60° clockwise, the butane molecule is now in a staggered conformation (right).

This conformation is more specifically referred to as the gauche conformation of butane. This is due to the fact that the methyl groups are staggered, but only 60° from one another. This conformation is more energetically favored than the eclipsed conformation, but it is not the most energetically favormable conformation.

Another 60° rotation gives us a second eclipsed conformation where both methyl groups are aligned with hydrogen atoms.

One more 60 rotation produces another staggered conformation referred to as the anti conformation. This occurs when the methyl groups are positioned oppositie (180°) of one another. This is the most energetically favorable conformation. 

Conformation energies can be visualized using graphs.This is a graph of ethane.

The minimums can be seen on the graph at 60, 180 and 300 degrees while the maximum can bee see at 0, 120, 240, and 360 degree. The maximums represent the eclipsed conformations due to the dihedral angle of zero degrees. The energy is raised do the repulsion of the electron cloud.

Structural Applications
As established by X-ray crystallography, octachlorodimolybdate(II) anion ([Mo2Cl8]4-) has an eclipsed conformation. This sterically unfavorable geometry is given as evidence for a quadruple bond between the Mo centers.

Experiments such as X-ray and electron diffraction analyses, nuclear magnetic resonance, microwave spectroscopies, and more have allowed researchers to determine which cycloalkane structures are the most stable based on the different possible conformations. Another method that was shown successful is molecular mechanics, a computational method that allows the total strain energies of different conformations to be found and analyzed (see also chemical bonding: Computational approaches to molecular structure). It was found that the most stable conformations had lower energies based on values of energy due to bond distances and bond angles.

In many cases, isomers of alkanes with branched chains have lower boiling points than those that are unbranched, which has been shown through experimentation with isomers of C8H18. This is because of a combination of intermolecular forces and size that results from the branched chains. The more branches that an alkane has, the more extended its shape is; meanwhile, if it is less branched then it will have more intermolecular attractive forces that will need to be broken which is the cause of the increased boiling point for unbranched alkanes. In another case, 2,2,3,3-tetramethylbutane is shaped more like an ellipsoid causing it to be able to form a crystal lattice which raises the melting point of the molecule because it will take more energy to transition from a solid to a liquid state.

See also
Gauche effect

References

Stereochemistry